This is a list of people from Mysore.

Anima Anandkumar, Bren Professor of Computing at Caltech and director of Machine Learning research at NVIDIA 
 Mysore T. Chowdiah, Pioneer of the seven-string Violin, Sangeetha Kalanidhi
 Sabu Dastagir, Hollywood Actor, inducted into the Hollywood Walk of Fame
 Gita Gopinath, Chief economist, IMF
 Vikas Gowda, Olympian, discus thrower and shot putter, Commonwealth Games Gold-Medallist
 B. K. S. Iyengar, Yoga Expert, Padma Vibhushan
 Mysore V. Doraiswamy Iyengar, Veena exponent, Padma Bhushan, Sangeetha Kalanidhi
 R. K. Laxman, cartoonist, Padma Vibhushan, Ramon Magsaysay Award for Journalism, Literature and Creative Communication Arts
Pavitra Lokesh, actress, Karnataka State Film Award for Best Actress
 N. R. Narayana Murthy, industrialist, co-founder of Infosys, Padma Vibhushan
 V. K. Murthy, cinematographer, Dada Saheb Phalke Award Winner
 Mysore brothers, Violin maestros and music composers, comprising Mysore Manjunath and Mysore Nagaraj
 R. K. Narayan, writer, Padma Vibhushan
 R. K. Srikantan, carnatic music vocalist, Padma Bhushan, Sangeetha Kalanidhi
 Javagal Srinath, former cricketer and current ICC Match referee
 Mysore Vasudevachar, musician and composer, Padma Bhushan

References

Mysore-related lists
Mysore
People from Mysore
Lists of people from Karnataka